Emily Anne Thornberry (born 27 July 1960) is a British politician who has been Member of Parliament (MP) for Islington South and Finsbury since 2005. A member of the Labour Party, she has served as Shadow Attorney General for England and Wales since 2021, and previously from 2011 to 2014. She has also served as Shadow Secretary of State for Foreign and Commonwealth Affairs from 2016 to 2020, Shadow First Secretary of State from 2017 to 2020 and Shadow Secretary of State for International Trade from 2020 to 2021.

The daughter of a teacher and a diplomat, Thornberry was born in Guildford, Surrey, and attended a local secondary modern school. After graduating from the University of Kent in Canterbury, she worked as a human rights lawyer from 1985 to 2005 and joined the Transport and General Workers' Union. 

Thornberry was first elected to Parliament in 2005 and served as Shadow Attorney General for England and Wales in Ed Miliband's shadow cabinet from 2011 until she resigned in 2014 after sending a tweet mocking a house with England flags. After Jeremy Corbyn won the 2015 Labour Party leadership election, Thornberry was appointed Shadow Minister of State for Employment in September 2015, Shadow Secretary of State for Defence in January 2016 and Shadow Secretary of State for Foreign and Commonwealth Affairs in June 2016. She was a candidate to succeed Corbyn as Leader of the Labour Party in the 2020 leadership election but was eliminated from the race after failing to obtain the number of nominations needed.

Thornberry was appointed to Keir Starmer's shadow cabinet as Shadow Secretary of State for International Trade and Shadow President of the Board of Trade  in April 2020. She was appointed Shadow Attorney General for England and Wales in November 2021.

Early life
Thornberry was born in Guildford, Surrey on 27 July 1960. Her parents were Sallie Thornberry (née Bone), a teacher, and Cedric Thornberry, at the time teaching international law at the London School of Economics, and later a United Nations Assistant Secretary-General. Due to her father's birth in Belfast she is an Irish citizen and Irish passport holder.  When Thornberry was seven, her parents divorced and she had to leave their home with her mother and two brothers. After this, she relied on free school meals and food parcels, and their cats were euthanised to save money. Her mother later became a Labour councillor and mayor (representing Stoke in Guildford from 1983 to 2003), and her father stood as the Labour candidate for Guildford in the 1966 general election.

She failed the eleven-plus exam, so attended a secondary modern school. She left to live with her father when she was fifteen until he left without warning to work for the United Nations when she was seventeen. She worked as a cleaner and a barmaid in London alongside resitting her O-Levels and taking her A-Levels. She went on to study law at the University of Kent in Canterbury, graduating in 1982, and afterwards led the students’ union as an elected full-time officer. She was called to the Bar at Gray's Inn and practised as a barrister specialising in human rights law from 1985 to 2005 under Michael Mansfield at Tooks Chambers.

Thornberry joined the Transport and General Workers' Union in 1985.

Political career

Before Parliament 
At the 2001 general election, Thornberry stood as the Labour candidate in Canterbury, but was defeated by the Conservative incumbent, Julian Brazier.

Following the decision of Chris Smith not to stand again, Thornberry was selected as the Labour candidate for Islington South and Finsbury for the 2005 general election through an all-women shortlist of prospective candidates. She was elected to Parliament with a majority of 484, narrowly beating the Liberal Democrats. Nick Smith (who was subsequently elected to Parliament representing Blaenau Gwent) served as her election agent.

Early Parliamentary career (2005–2010)
Thornberry made her maiden speech in the House of Commons on 24 May 2005. In Parliament, she has been a member of the Environmental Audit Committee and was on the Communities and Local Government Select Committee during the 2005–10 Parliament. She has served as vice-chair of the All-Party Parliamentary Cycling Group and the All-Party Parliamentary Pro-Choice and Sexual Health Group.

In 2006, Thornberry was criticised by the Parliamentary Commissioner for Standards Philip Mawer for adding a quote from herself into a news release by the Electoral Commission. She was found not to have broken the Parliamentary code of conduct.

Thornberry's main interests since becoming an MP have been in health, housing, the environment and equality. She has also spoken on the need for more affordable housing, particularly in Islington. In 2006, Thornberry introduced the Housing Association Bill, a Private Member's Bill which sought to improve the control of housing association tenants over their landlords. Many of the ideas from this bill were taken up by the Cave Review. On environmental matters, Thornberry worked with Friends of the Earth and World Wide Fund for Nature (WWF) to campaign for a Climate Change Bill and a Marine Bill. In 2006, Thornberry won the ePolitix Award for Environment Champion of the Year after being nominated by WWF.

In 2008, Thornberry supported a change in the law to allow single women and lesbian couples to seek in vitro fertilisation treatment.

In 2009, she was appointed as a ministerial aide in the Department of Energy and Climate Change and attended the Copenhagen Summit in December that year with Joan Ruddock and Ed Miliband.

Opposition under Ed Miliband (2010–2015)

In May 2010, Thornberry was returned as MP for Islington South and Finsbury with an increased majority, in a seat identified as the Liberal Democrats' top target in England for the 2010 general election.

Thornberry was promoted to Shadow Minister for the Department of Energy and Climate Change in May 2010. In the role she shadowed Charles Hendry. Thornberry missed out on a place in Labour's shadow cabinet, then elected by Labour MPs, by one vote. She was instead promoted to the role of shadow care minister under the shadow health secretary John Healey.

As shadow care minister, Thornberry criticised the coalition government's lack of action over failing care home operator Southern Cross, calling for action and that the government put in place a plan B should the operator fail. She criticised the government over the Winterbourne View care home abuse scandal, calling for an investigation into the affair. In April 2011, Thornberry surveyed all the local government directors of adult social care and highlighted the pressures on care for the elderly by the coalition government's cuts to local authority funds.

Thornberry was appointed shadow attorney general in October 2011, in which capacity she attended shadow cabinet meetings. Thornberry called for action by Dominic Grieve over Applied Language Solutions' failure to provide interpreters for court proceedings, and called on the attorney general to ensure that allegations of bribery involving Bernie Ecclestone were properly investigated.

In 2011, Thornberry challenged prime minister David Cameron over his false claims about wages at Islington Council, campaigning against government measures which Thornberry claimed to have exacerbated child poverty in Islington, and answering over 1,000 enquiries a month from constituents.

Thornberry resigned her shadow cabinet position on 20 November 2014, shortly after polls closed in the Rochester and Strood by-election. Earlier in the day, she had received criticism after tweeting a photograph of a house in the constituency adorned with three flags of St. George and the owner's white van parked outside on the driveway, under the caption "Image from #Rochester", provoking accusations of snobbery. She was criticised by fellow Labour Party MPs, including leader Ed Miliband, who said her tweet conveyed a "sense of disrespect", Chris Bryant, who said that it broke the "first rule of politics" and Simon Danczuk, who said that the party had been "hijacked by the north London liberal elite".

Thornberry was one of 36 Labour MPs to nominate Jeremy Corbyn as a candidate in the Labour leadership election of 2015, though she later stated that she would be supporting Yvette Cooper.

Opposition under Jeremy Corbyn (2015–2020)

In September 2015, she was appointed as the shadow minister for employment by the new Labour leader Jeremy Corbyn. She was promoted to shadow defence secretary in January 2016, replacing Maria Eagle. Thornberry advocated spending money on the army rather than on the UK's Trident nuclear programme. On being appointed, Thornberry was interviewed by the British Forces Broadcasting Service, where she defended her appointment, saying she had "quite a lot more experience than people might think I do. I was made an honorary lieutenant colonel when I was doing court-martials [sic] when I was a barrister so I have a certain amount of experience of the military there." 
  During her role as shadow defence secretary, Thornberry conducted a review of defence policy, including the role of the nuclear deterrent, which was delayed following the 2016 United Kingdom European Union membership referendum. During a private Labour discussion about the nuclear deterrent, Thornberry asked what "Defcon One", a status of the United States nuclear defence rating, meant.

Thornberry was promoted to Shadow Foreign Secretary in June 2016 after Corbyn fired Hilary Benn. She held the role of Shadow Brexit Secretary concurrently until Keir Starmer took on the role later that year. She accused Sky News presenter Dermot Murnaghan of sexism after he asked her to name French minister of foreign affairs and international development, Jean-Marc Ayrault and the president of South Korea, which she was unable to do. Following the 2017 general election, she was given the additional role of Shadow First Secretary of State, effectively acting as Corbyn's number 2.

Thornberry opposed Britain's involvement in the Saudi Arabian-led intervention in Yemen against the Shia Houthis. She said that "while Saudi Arabia will remain a valued strategic, security and economic ally in the years to come, our support for their forces in Yemen must be suspended until the alleged violations of international humanitarian law in that conflict have been fully and independently investigated." In May 2018 Thornberry said support in Syria for the country's president, Bashar al-Assad, had been "underestimated" in the West. In October 2018 Thornberry criticised Theresa May's government's response to Jamal Khashoggi's disappearance as "too little, too late". She said: "Imagine how this government would have reacted if either Russia or Iran had abducted–and in all likelihood murdered–one of their dissident journalists within the sovereign territory of another country."

After Corbyn announced he was stepping down as leader, Thornberry was the first to officially announce that she would be running for leader of the Labour Party.
Defeated Labour MP Caroline Flint appeared on Sophy Ridge on Sunday and accused Thornberry of saying that Brexit voters in Northern England were 'stupid'. Thornberry appeared on ITV News and accused Flint of 'making up shit about her' and threatened to take legal action. She was eventually eliminated from the leadership election after failing to achieve enough nominations from constituency parties or affiliated groups.

After the killing of Qasem Soleimani in the 2020 Baghdad International Airport airstrike, Thornberry condemned the actions of the United States government. She said that she shed no tears over the death, but was fearful of escalating tensions in the region.

Opposition under Keir Starmer (2020–present)

Thornberry was replaced as Shadow Foreign Secretary by Lisa Nandy upon the election of Keir Starmer as Leader of the Labour Party. Thornberry herself was not sacked from the Official Opposition frontbench, but instead moved to a different frontbench role, becoming the new Shadow Secretary of State for International Trade. She replaced Barry Gardiner, and said on Twitter that, "It's been a pleasure to work with Barry Gardiner these past four years... I hope I can take the fight to the government on International Trade as effectively as he did, and I'll be very lucky to have his advice".

In late December 2020, Thornberry voted for the European Union (Future Relationship) Act 2020, in line with the Labour Chief Whip.

In the November 2021 shadow cabinet reshuffle, Thornberry was appointed Shadow Attorney General for England and Wales.

Campaigns

Affordable housing

Thornberry's constituency falls within the London Borough of Islington, one of the most deprived areas of the country with disproportionately high house prices and private sector rents. She has supported measures by Islington Council to free up under-occupied homes by supporting tenants to downsize and to stop foreign investors from buying new homes and leaving them empty. She has also called for a greater degree of control over private sector rents and more support for social house-building. Thornberry has frequently campaigned for a greater commitment to affordable and social housing. She was criticised when the local Islington Tribune newspaper discovered that her husband had bought a former social house which was being rented out to her aides. Thornberry said the purchase was "not about property speculation".

In 2015 Thornberry clashed with Boris Johnson, the mayor of London, over the proposed redevelopments of the Mount Pleasant Mail Centre, the sorting office run by the Royal Mail, and the Clerkenwell Fire Station, both in her constituency. Camden and Islington councils sought to require a high proportion of the resulting new homes to be made available for social rent, but Johnson overturned this and allowed homes designated as "affordable" to charge rents of up to 80 percent of market rates. Thornberry criticised Johnson, describing his definition of affordability as "nonsense", and called for at least 50% of homes in the new developments to be made available for social rent.

Statue of Emily Davison
In 2013, the 100th anniversary of the death of the suffragette Emily Davison, Thornberry called for a statue commemorating Davison in Parliament. She arranged a public meeting to discuss options for a memorial, attended by around 800 people, and settled on the idea of a statue as an appropriate memorial, pointing out that there were very few statues of female politicians and activists in Parliament.

Equal pay
In March 2015, Thornberry launched a campaign for a new Equal Pay Act. She said that, 45 years after the original Equal Pay Act was passed in 1970, women still earned 19% less than men on average.

Personal life
Thornberry has lived in Islington since the early 1990s. In July 1991 she married Christopher Nugee, of Wilberforce Chambers, in Tower Hamlets, and they have two sons and a daughter. Nugee later became Queen's Counsel, then a High Court Judge, when he was knighted, at which point Thornberry became entitled to be styled Lady Nugee, but does not use the title. Nugee later became a Lord Justice of Appeal. Since 1993 they have lived on Richmond Crescent, Barnsbury, where Tony Blair also lived until the 1997 general election, moving in on the same day as the Blairs. Thornberry also part-owns properties in Guildford and South London; her property portfolio "is believed to be worth £4.6 million."

In April 2005, it was reported that Thornberry and Nugee had sent their son to the partially selective Dame Alice Owen's state school  from their home and outside her constituency. The school was formerly based in Islington and reserved a quota of 10% of its places for Islington pupils. The Labour Party opposes selection and Thornberry was criticised over the matter as a result. Chris Woodhead, the former chief inspector of schools, said: "I celebrate her good sense as a parent and deplore her hypocrisy as a politician. When will those who espouse the virtues of comprehensive education apply the logic of their political message to their children?" Later, Thornberry's daughter attended the same school.

References

External links

 
 
 Islington South & Finsbury Labour Party
 Debretts People of Today

Audio clips
 Women's Parliamentary Radio Online audio interview discussing her life as a female MP

News items
 Defending two mother families in May 2008
 Camden New Journal

|-

|-

|-

|-

|-

|-

|-

|-

|-

|-

|-

1960 births
Living people
Alumni of the University of Kent
Members of Gray's Inn
British feminists
British socialists
English barristers
Female members of the Parliament of the United Kingdom for English constituencies
Labour Party (UK) MPs for English constituencies
People from Guildford
Politics of the London Borough of Islington
British socialist feminists
UK MPs 2005–2010
UK MPs 2010–2015
UK MPs 2015–2017
UK MPs 2017–2019
UK MPs 2019–present
Members of the Privy Council of the United Kingdom
21st-century British women politicians
Wives of knights
Women deputy opposition leaders
Deputy opposition leaders